France competed at the 1920 Summer Olympics in Antwerp, Belgium. 304 competitors, 296 men and 8 women, took part in 113 events in 23 sports.

Medalists

Gold
 Julien Louis Brule — Archery, Men's Individual moving bird 50m
 Joseph Guillemot — Athletics, Men's 5000m
 Paul Fritsch — Boxing, Featherweight
 Fernand Canteloube, Georges Detreille, Achille Souchard and Marcel Gobillot — Cycling, Men's Time Trial
 Armand Massard — Fencing, Men's Individual Epee
 Suzanne Lenglen and Max Decugis — Tennis, Mixed doubles
 Suzanne Lenglen — Tennis, Women's singles
 Henri Gance — Weightlifting, Middleweight
 Ernest Cadine — Weightlifting, Light heavyweight

Silver
 Julien Louis Brulé, Léonce Gaston Quentin, Pascal Fauvel, Eugène Grisot, Eugène Richez, Artur Mabellon, Léon Epin and Paul Leroy — Archery, Men's Team moving bird 33m
 Julien Louis Brulé, Léonce Gaston Quentin, Pascal Fauvel, Eugène Grisot, Eugène Richez, Artur Mabellon, Léon Epin and Paul Leroy — Archery, Men's Team moving bird 50m
 Léonce Gaston Quentin — Archery, Men's Individual moving bird 28m
 Julien Louis Brule — Archery, Men's Individual moving bird 33m
 Joseph Guillemot — Athletics, Men's 10000m
 René Tirard, René Lorain, René Mourlon and Émile Ali-Khan — Athletics, Men's 4 × 100 m relay
 Jean Gachet — Boxing, Featherweight
 Field — Equestrian, Individual vaulting
 Field, Salins, Cauchy — Equestrian, Team vaulting
 Alexandre Lippmann — Fencing, Men's Individual Epee
 Philippe Cattiau — Fencing, Men's Individual Foil
 André Labattut, Georges Trombert, Marcel Perrot, Lucien Gaudin, Philippe Cattiau, Roger François Ducret, Gaston Amson and Lionel Bony De Castellane — Fencing, Men's Team Foil
 Jean Margraff, Marc Marie Jean Perrodon, Henri Marie Raoul De Saint Germain and Georges Trombert — Fencing, Men's Team Sabre
 Marco Torrès — Gymnastics, Men's Individual all-around
 Gabriel Poix, Maurice Monney-Bouton and Ernest Barberolle — Rowing, Men's pair with coxswain (2+)
 Men's Team — Rugby
 Albert Weil, Félix Picon and Robert Monier — Sailing, 6.5 metre class (1919 rating)
 Léon Johnson, Émile Rumeau, Achille Paroche, André Parmentier and Georges Roes — Shooting, Men's Team 300m military rifle, prone
 Léon Johnson — Shooting, Men's 300m military rifle, prone

Bronze
 Julien Louis Brulé, Léonce Gaston Quentin, Pascal Fauvel, Eugène Grisot, Eugène Richez, Artur Mabellon, Léon Epin and Paul Leroy — Archery, Men's Team moving bird 28m
 Géo André, Gaston Féry, Maurice Delvart and André Devaux — Athletics, Men's 4 × 400 m relay
 Albert Eluère — Boxing, Heavyweight
 Fernand Canteloube — Cycling, Men's Individual Time Trial
 Gustave Buchard — Fencing, Men's Individual Epee
 Armand Massard, Alexandre Lippmann, Gustave Buchard, Georges Casanova, Georges Trombert, Gaston Amson and Louis Moureau — Fencing, Men's Team Epee
 Roger François Ducret — Fencing, Men's Individual Foil
 Jean Gounot — Gymnastics, Men's Individual all-around
 Men's Team — Gymnastics
 Gaston Giran and Alfred Plé — Rowing, Men's double scull (2x)
 Pierre Albarran and Max Decugis — Tennis, Men's doubles
 Elisabeth D'Ayen and Suzanne Lenglen — Tennis, Women's doubles
 Louis Bernot — Weightlifting, Heavyweight

Archery

France sent eight archers in its third Olympic archery appearance, all of whom won at least three medals. The team ended up with one gold medal, four silvers, and a bronze. Because of the lack of competition, the team's worst possible result would have been five silvers and a bronze; thus, Brulé's victory over Belgium's van Innis in the individual moving bird at 50 metres to take the gold medal was the only actual success the team had.

Aquatics

Diving

A single diver represented France in 1920. It was the nation's debut appearance in the sport. Weil came in last in his springboard semifinal group and did not advance to the final.

 Men

Ranks given are within the semifinal group.

Swimming

Thirteen swimmers, ten men and three women, represented France in 1920. It was the nation's fourth appearance in the sport. None of the swimmers were able to advance to an event final.

Ranks given are within the heat.

 Men

 Women

Water polo

France competed in the Olympic water polo tournament for the third time in 1920. A modified version of the Bergvall System was in use at the time. France was defeated by Brazil in the opening round, not qualifying for either the silver or bronze tournaments.

 Round of 16

 Final rank 11th

Athletics

59 athletes represented France in 1920. It was France's sixth appearance in athletics, having competed in the sport at every Olympics. Guillemot took the nation's first Olympic gold medal in athletics by winning the 5,000 metres. He also added a silver in the 10,000 while the team took two more medals in the relay events.

Ranks given are within the heat.

Boxing 

15 boxers represented France at the 1920 Games. It was the nation's second appearance in boxing. The team won three medals, including one of each type, after four of the 15 men advanced to the semifinals. The two French featherweight boxers faced off in the finals, taking gold and silver. The bronze came in the heavyweight class. France, which had not won a single bout in 1908, took fourth place on the boxing medals leader board.

Cycling

Thirteen cyclists represented France in 1920. It was the nation's fifth appearance in the sport. After a disappointing result in 1912, the French road cyclists had a better Games in 1920. The four-man team took the gold medal in the team time trial, on the strength of three top-10 individual performances including Canteloube's individual bronze. The track cyclists were unable to take a medal, with highlights including Lanusse reaching the semifinals of the sprint and Alancourt taking eighth in the 50 kilometres.

Road cycling

Track cycling

Ranks given are within the heat.

Equestrian

Twenty-four equestrians represented France in 1920. It was the nation's third appearance in the sport, having been one of three countries (along with Belgium and the United States) to have appeared at each Olympic equestrian competition. For the first time, France earned no gold medals in equestrian. The best results for the country were in vaulting with a pair of silvers, one by Field in the individual and one by the team in combined score.

Fencing

Eighteen fencers represented France in 1920. It was the nation's fourth appearance in the sport, and first since 1908. France, as usual, had a strong performance in the sport. The French épéeists swept the individual medals for the second time (having accomplished the feat in 1908 as well), and the foilists took a silver and a bronze. France took a medal in each of the three team events, but won no more gold medals. The team's eight total medals were the most of any nation in 1920, and the gold medal in the épée made France one of only two nations to win any golds (Italy took the other five).

Ranks given are within the group.

Field hockey

France competed in field hockey for the second time. The team took fourth place in the four-team round robin, losing to each of the other three teams.

Football

France competed in the Olympic football tournament for the third time. After receiving a bye into the quarterfinal, which was awarded as a 2-0 victory due to Switzerland withdrawing the morning before the first round due to internal dissent, France defeated Italy to move into the semifinals. The team was defeated there by Czechoslovakia. Under the Bergvall System in use for the tournament, France would still have gad the opportunity to play for the silver medal; however, the team left host nation Belgium after their semifinal loss and did not play in the tournament for second place.

 Quarterfinals

 Semifinals

Final rank 6th

Gymnastics

Twenty-nine gymnasts represented France in 1920. It was the nation's fifth appearance in the sport, matched only by Great Britain. France took three medals, a silver and two bronzes.

Artistic gymnastics

Ice hockey

France competed in the inaugural Olympic ice hockey tournament. The team received a bye into the semifinals, but was defeated by Sweden there. Under the Bergvall System in place at the time, Sweden's losses in the gold medal final and the silver medal semifinals meant that France played no further; a far different fate from the other semifinal loser—the United States, who won the silver medal.

 Roster
Coach:  Ernie Garon

 Gold medal semifinals

Final rank 5th (Tied)

Modern pentathlon

Four pentathletes represented France in 1920. It was the nation's second appearance in the sport, having competed in both instances of the Olympic pentathlon.

A point-for-place system was used, with the lowest total score winning.

Rowing

Fourteen rowers represented France in 1920. It was the nation's third appearance in the sport. All three boats placed in the top four, including a silver and a bronze medal.

Ranks given are within the heat.

Rugby union

France competed in the Olympic rugby tournament for the second time. The winners of the gold medal in 1900, France was one of only two teams to compete in 1920. The French team were shut out by the United States, losing 8–0 to take the silver medal.

 Final

Final rank  Silver

Sailing

Three sailors represented France in 1920. It was the nation's fourth appearance in the sport, making France the only nation to have competed in rowing each time the sport was held at the Olympics. France's single boat finished second of two, taking a silver medal.

Skating

Figure skating

Two figure skaters represented France in 1920. It was the nation's debut appearance in the sport. The Sabourets finished in seventh place of eight in the pairs.

Shooting

Seventeen shooters represented France in 1920. It was the nation's fifth appearance in the sport; France was one of three nations (along with Denmark and Great Britain) to have competed at each Olympic shooting contest to that point. France took a single medal: Johnson's silver in the 300 metre military rifle prone position.

Tennis

Ten tennis players, seven men and two women, competed for France in 1920. It was the nation's fifth appearance in the sport, tied with Great Britain for the most of any country. Lenglen won the women's singles gold, not losing a single game until her fourth match and not losing any of her ten sets. Lenglen also paired with Décugis to take the gold in the mixed pairs, and added a bronze medal in the women's pairs with D'Ayen. Décugis and Albarran won the bronze in the men's pairs, beating Blanchy and Brugnon in the bronze medal match.

Weightlifting

Ten weightlifters, two in each weight class, represented France in 1920. It was the nation's debut appearance in the sport. Cadine and Gance won their weight classes, making France the only country that year to take two championships. France tied Belgium for most total medals, with three.

Wrestling

Seventeen wrestlers competed for France in 1920. It was the nation's second appearance in the sport. The French wrestlers were not very successful, winning only two matches out of the twenty-four they contested.

Freestyle

Greco-Roman

Art Competitions

References

External links
 
 
 International Olympic Committee results database

Nations at the 1920 Summer Olympics
1920
Olympics